The Boston Blazers were a member of the Major Indoor Lacrosse League from 1989 to 1997. They were called the New England Blazers from 1989 to 1991 while based in Worcester, Massachusetts, and were renamed the Boston Blazers in 1992 when they moved to Boston. While in Worcester, the Blazers played at the Worcester Centrum. In Boston, they played at the Boston Garden from 1992–1995 and then moved to the FleetCenter in 1996 and played there until 1997.

A separate franchise, also known as the Boston Blazers, was founded in 2007 and played in the National Lacrosse League from 2009 to 2013. While the name of the new team was chosen "in part due to the popularity and nostalgia associated with the former Boston Blazers franchise" it did not share any lineage with the MILL Blazers.

Awards & honors

All time Record

Playoff Results

References

External links
https://web.archive.org/web/20050729024306/http://www.arenamedia.com/content/blazers/index.shtml

Defunct National Lacrosse League teams
Lacrosse teams in Boston
Lacrosse clubs established in 1992
Lacrosse clubs disestablished in 1997
Major Indoor Lacrosse League teams
1992 establishments in Massachusetts
1997 disestablishments in Massachusetts